Haute-Banio  is a department of Nyanga Province in south-western Gabon. It is the most southernly department in Gabon and borders the Republic of the Congo. The capital lies at Ndindi. It had a population of 1,413 in 2013.

Towns and villages

Capital Haute Banio is Ndindi

References

Nyanga Province
Departments of Gabon